Urophora syriaca is a species of tephritid or fruit flies in the genus Urophora of the family Tephritidae.

Distribution
Syria, Lebanon, Israel

References

Urophora
Insects described in 1927
Diptera of Asia